Rochester-upon-Medway was a non-metropolitan district in Kent, England. It was abolished on 1 April 1998 and replaced by Medway.

Political control
From the first election to the council in 1973 until its abolition in 1998, political control of the council was held by the following parties:

Leadership
The leaders of the council from 1991 until its abolition were:

Council elections
The last election results were: 

1973 Medway Borough Council election
1976 Medway Borough Council election
1979 Medway Borough Council election (New ward boundaries)
1983 Rochester-upon-Medway City Council election
1987 Rochester-upon-Medway City Council election
1991 Rochester-upon-Medway City Council election
1995 Rochester-upon-Medway City Council election

City result maps

By-election results

References

External links

 
Rochester, Kent
Council elections in Kent
District council elections in England